Hoërskool Brandwag is an Afrikaans medium school in Uitenhage (Nelson Mandela Bay Metropolitan Municipality), South Africa, with an academic orientation. The school opened in 1937, and is named after a peak in the Drakensberg in Golden Gate Highlands National Park, called "The Sentinel" in English, which appears on the school's emblem. Its motto is "U dienswillige dienaar" (Your obedient servant), which was the title of the autobiography of Afrikaans literary figure Cornelis Jacobus Langenhoven.

Athletic teams include rugby and netball.

References

External links
Hoërskool Brandwag - Official website

1937 establishments in South Africa
Educational institutions established in 1937
High schools in South Africa
Schools in the Eastern Cape
Afrikaans-language schools
Nelson Mandela Bay Metropolitan Municipality